Pat Quartermain (born 16 April 1937) is an English former footballer who played for Oxford United and Cambridge United. During his spell at Oxford, he played 285 league games. Although joining Oxford United in 1955 as an amateur, he didn't turn professional until 1962 when the team joined The Football League.

After his playing career he managed Clanfield getting them to win the Hellenic Football League cup in the 1973–74 season.

References

External links
Rage Online profile

1937 births
English footballers
Association football defenders
Cambridge United F.C. players
Oxford United F.C. players
English Football League players
Living people